Manuel de la Torre Gutiérrez, O. de M. (1635–1694) was a Roman Catholic prelate who served as Archbishop of Lanciano (1688–1694).

Biography
Manuel de la Torre Gutiérrez was born in Alcalá de Henares, Spain on 18 June 1635 and ordained a priest in the Order of the Blessed Virgin Mary of Mercy.
On 9 August 1688, he was appointed Archbishop of Lanciano by Pope Innocent XI.

On 24 August 1688, he was consecrated bishop by Carlo Pio di Savoia, Cardinal-Bishop of Sabina, with Pietro de Torres, Archbishop of Dubrovnik, and Pier Antonio Capobianco, Bishop Emeritus of Lacedonia, serving as co-consecrators. 

He served as Archbishop of Lanciano until his death on 21 July 1694.

References

External links and additional sources
 (for Chronology of Bishops) 
 (for Chronology of Bishops) 

17th-century Roman Catholic archbishops in the Kingdom of Naples
Bishops appointed by Pope Innocent XI
1635 births
1694 deaths
People from Alcalá de Henares
Mercedarian bishops